One Word Extinguisher is the second studio album by American electronic music producer Prefuse 73. It was released on Warp on May 6, 2003. It peaked at number 41 on the Billboard Independent Albums chart.

Critical reception

At Metacritic, which assigns a weighted average score out of 100 to reviews from mainstream critics, One Word Extinguisher received an average score of 86 out of 100 based on 21 reviews, indicating "universal acclaim".

John Bush of AllMusic called the album "a set of electronica that's nearly as challenging as Autechre's relentlessly academic beat manipulation but just as funky and instantly gratifying as a Fatboy Slim flag-waver." David Morris of PopMatters described it as "meticulously constructed and flawlessly engineered music". Uncut praised the album as a "marvel of hip hop knowledge and glitch science".

In 2017, Pitchfork placed One Word Extinguisher at number 15 on its list of "The 50 Best IDM Albums of All Time".

Track listing

Charts

References

External links
 

2003 albums
Prefuse 73 albums
Warp (record label) albums